The European Association of Vertebrate Palaeontologists (EAVP) is a society for the advancement of vertebrate palaeontology in Europe.

EAVP
The European Association of Vertebrate Palaeontologists (EAVP) was founded in 2003 for individuals with an interest in vertebrate palaeontology. EAVP currently has over 100 members, the vast majority of them professional vertebrate palaeontologists. EAVP understands itself as a forum for palaeontologists in a traditionally multilingual and multicultural area, defining "Europe" not in a political, but in a geographical and cultural meaning. EAVP is legally based in Germany.

Aims
EAVP's aim are to

- launch and support international projects in the field of vertebrate palaeontology with a European contribution
- encourage and assist students to take part in such projects to create an improved source of future vertebrate palaeontologists
- set up or organise funds from European foundations and other sponsors
- maintain a plurality of methods
- encourage contacts and collaboration between European vertebrate palaeontologists by supporting each year the organisation of the Workshop of the EAVP in a different European country, in a historical continuity of the European Workshop on Vertebrate Palaeontology.

Workshops and annual meetings
EAVP hosts a yearly workshop in different European locations. For the 200th birthday of Charles Darwin EAVP additionally hosted an Extraordinary Meeting at the Royal Belgian Institute of Natural Sciences.

Annual Meetings of the European Association of Vertebrate Palaeontologists:
16th: Caparica, Portugal, 26 June - 1 July 2018
15th: Munich, Germany: 31 July-5 August 2017
14th: Haarlem, The Netherlands: 6-10 July 2016
13th: Opole, Poland: 8-12 July 2015
12th: Torino, northwest Italy: 24-28 June 2014
11th: Villers-sur-Mer, France: 10-15 June 2013
10th: Teruel, Spain: 19-24 June 2012
9th: Heraklion, Crete, Greece: 14-19 June 2011
8th: Aix-en-Provence, France: 7-12 June 2010
7th: Berlin, Germany: 20 - 24 July 2009
6th: Spiská Nová Ves, Slovakia: 30 June - 5 July 2008
5th: Carcassonne, France: 15-19 May 2007
4th: Budapest, Hungary: 10-15 July 2006
3rd: Darmstadt, Germany: 18-23 July 2005
2nd: Brno, Czech Republic: 19-24 July 2004
1st: Basel, Switzerland: 15-19 July 2003

Annual meeting of the European Workshop of Vertebrate Paleontology
7th: Sibiu, Romania: 2-7 July 2002
6th: Firenze, Italy: 19-22 September 2001
5th: Karlsruhe, Germany: 27 June-1 July 2000
4th: Albarracín, Spain: 8-12 June 1999
3rd: Maastricht, The Netherlands: 6-9 May 
2nd: Espéranza, France: 7-10 May 1997
1st: Copenhagen, Denmark: 1-4 May 1996

Publications
EAVP's official journal is the peer-reviewed palaeontological journal Oryctos, which publishes French or English peer-reviewed original contributions on all aspects of Vertebrate Palaeontology and Comparative anatomy, as well as papers dealing with the history of those scientific disciplines.

For each EAVP workshop an abstract volume is published.

Funds
With the Raymonde Rivoallan Fund EAVP has established a fund that contributes travel funding for two students each year for participation in the EAVP workshops.

References

Paleontological institutions and organizations
Organizations established in 2003